Henk van Brussel (12 June 1936 – 7 October 2007) was a football player and manager from the Netherlands.

Playing career

Club
Van Brussel played for local side Excelsior '31 and was part of the Go Ahead squad that won promotion to the Eredivisie in 1963.

Managerial career
Van Brussel worked for Go Ahead Eagles, Rohda Raalte (amateurs), SC Heerenveen, De Graafschap, FC Groningen and SC Heracles. At Heerenveen his playing style was called the "Brussels Luna Park", because of his open attacking play which resulted in a surge in attendances.

Death
Van Brussel died from heart failure during a vacation stay in Turkey.

References

External links
 Necrologie:Henk van Brussel 1935-2007; Vriendelijke vakman (Obituary) - De Stentor 

1936 births
2007 deaths
People from Rijssen
Association football midfielders
Dutch footballers
Go Ahead Eagles players
De Graafschap players
Dutch football managers
Go Ahead Eagles managers
SC Heerenveen managers
De Graafschap managers
FC Groningen managers
Heracles Almelo managers
Rohda Raalte managers
Footballers from Overijssel